Joanna Frank (born Johanna Bochco; March 7, 1941) is an American actress.

Career
Her first role was in Elia Kazan's 1963 film America, America as the character "Vartuhi", and she also appeared in The Young Animals (1968) and the cult biker film The Savage Seven (1968). Her later film credits included roles in Henry Jaglom's Always, But Not Forever (1985), and the romantic comedy Say Anything... (1989).

On television her first roles were as the malevolent "Regina" in The Outer Limits episode "ZZZZZ" (Season 1, Episode 18), which aired January 27, 1964. The following day, January 28, 1964, the episode "Where the Action Is" in The Fugitive in which she appeared as "Chris Polichek", aired (Season 1, Episode 18). Years later, she appeared on L.A. Law, which was co-created by her brother, television director and producer Steven Bochco and starring her husband, Alan Rachins.

Personal life 
She is the elder sister of Steven Bochco, the producer of Hill Street Blues and NYPD Blue. Her husband is actor Alan Rachins of Dharma and Greg and L. A. Law. The couple has one child.

Filmography

Film

Television

References

External links

1941 births
Living people
Actors Studio alumni
American film actresses
American television actresses
Jewish American actresses
Actresses from New York City
21st-century American Jews
21st-century American women